Zonguldak railway station is a regional (formally inter-city) railway station in Zonguldak, Turkey. It is the western terminus of the Zonguldak-Filyos Regional and was the former northern terminus of the Karaelmas Express from Ankara. It was opened in 1937 as the northern terminus of the Irmak-Zonguldak railway. The railway today is primarily a freight railway as the only passenger service is a thrice-daily regional service to Filyos. The station is located in the neighborhood of Karaelmas along İstasyon Street in the southern part of the city.

External links
Zonguldak-Filyos regional timetable
Zonguldak station information

Railway stations in Zonguldak Province
Railway stations opened in 1937
Buildings and structures in Zonguldak Province
Transport in Zonguldak Province
1937 establishments in Turkey